Thomas Vesey Dawson (1768–1811) was an Anglican priest in Ireland during the late 18th and early centuries.

Dawson was born in Dublin; and educated at Trinity College, Dublin. He was Dean of Killala from 1795 until 1796; Archdeacon of Tuam from April to July 1806; and Dean of Clonmacnoise from July 1806 until his death. Dawson's elder brother Richard was the father of Richard Thomas Dawson, 2nd Baron Cremorne.

Notes

Alumni of Trinity College Dublin
18th-century Irish Anglican priests
19th-century Irish Anglican priests
Archdeacons of Tuam
Deans of Killala
Deans of Clonmacnoise
Thomas
Christian clergy from Dublin (city)
1768 births
1811 deaths